Dactyloceras tridentata is a moth in the family Brahmaeidae. It was described by A. Conte in 1911. It is found in the Democratic Republic of the Congo.

References

Brahmaeidae
Moths described in 1911
Endemic fauna of the Democratic Republic of the Congo